Mark Ezzard Quamina (born 25 November 1969) is an English former professional footballer who played in the Football League as a midfielder.

References

1969 births
Living people
Footballers from Sutton, London
English footballers
Association football midfielders
Wimbledon F.C. players
Aalesunds FK players
Plymouth Argyle F.C. players
Slough Town F.C. players
Welling United F.C. players
Tooting & Mitcham United F.C. players
English Football League players
National League (English football) players